Jandol (also called Jandool or Jandul) was a minor Pashtun princely state at the time of the British Raj. It was established circa 1830, with its capital at Barwa (modern Samarbagh). Umra Khan was probably its most prominent ruler. It became a part of the princely state of Dir and later of Pakistan as a result of the integration of the princely states of Pakistan.

Khans
The Khans include:
 1791-1820: Hayat Khan
1820-?: Abdul Ghafar Khan
?-?: Faiz Talab Khan
?-1879: Aman Khan
1879-1881: Muhammad Zaman Khan
1881- c.1904: Umra Khan
1947-1969: Nawabzada Shahabuddin Khan

References 

Princely states of Pakistan